The tables below cover every one of the 280 squadrons listed in the U.S. Navy's two-volume Dictionary of American Naval Aviation Squadrons (DANAS). Volume 1 covers every squadron in the Attack (VA) and Strike Fighter (VFA) communities from 1935 to 1995. Volume 2 covers every squadron in the Patrol (VP) community from 1922 through 1996.

You can see any squadron's DANAS article by following the link to the cited reference and scrolling down to the appropriate page. You can see its Wikipedia article by clicking the Wikilink in the table; if there is no Wikilink, there is no known article for the squadron.

VA squadrons
This table shows the 88 VA Attack Squadrons listed in Volume 1 of DANAS. A detailed lineage list for all squadrons mentioned in Volume 1 is available HERE.

The articles for these squadrons are in the process of being renamed to parallel the names of articles in the other sections. For example, Third VA-34 (U.S. Navy) will become merely VA-34. This is an intricate process incorporating lessons learned while creating over a hundred squadron articles, and requiring coordination among several Wiki Projects; please do not rename any of these squadron articles yourself unless you are totally aware of all the intricacies.

VAH, VAK, VAL & VAP squadrons
This table shows the 5 VAH Heavy Attack, 2 VAK Tactical Aerial Refueling, 1 VAL Light Attack, and 2 VAP Heavy Photographic squadrons listed in Volume 1 of DANAS. A detailed lineage list for all squadrons mentioned in Volume 1 is available HERE.

VFA squadrons
This table shows the 31 VFA Strike Fighter squadrons listed in Volume 1 of DANAS. A detailed lineage list for all squadrons mentioned in Volume 1 is available HERE.

VP squadrons
This table shows the 78 VP Patrol Squadrons listed in Volume 2 of DANAS. An Index of Squadron Histories and Aircraft Data for all squadrons in Volume 2 is available HERE. A detailed lineage list for all squadrons mentioned in Volume 2 is available HERE.

VPB, VP(HL) & VP(AM) squadrons
This table shows the 68 VPB Patrol Bombing, 3 VP(HL) Heavy Patrol, and 2 VP(AM) Amphibian Patrol squadrons listed in Volume 2 of DANAS. An Index of Squadron Histories and Aircraft Data for all squadrons in Volume 2 is available HERE. A detailed lineage list for all squadrons mentioned in Volume 2 is available HERE.

Notes

See also
 Squadron (aviation)
 Attack aircraft
 Strike fighter
 Maritime patrol aircraft
 List of United States Navy aircraft squadrons
 List of inactive United States Navy aircraft squadrons
 Naval aviation
 Modern US Navy carrier air operations
 List of United States Navy aircraft designations (pre-1962)
 United States Naval Aviator
 Naval Flight Officer
 United States Marine Corps Aviation
 NATOPS

References

External links
 Viewable and downloadable version of DANAS Volume 1 (581 pages, 7.7 MB PDF file)
These are links to PDF files that are shorter and more manageable subsets of the complete volume:
Table of Contents of DANAS Volume 1, with links to PDF files of individual chapters, appendixes and sections
Title page, About the Author, Contents, Foreword, Preface and Acknowledgements
Chapter 1 The Evolution of Aircraft Class and Squadron Designation Systems
Chapter 2 Attack Squadron Histories for VA-1E to VA-23
Chapter 2 Attack Squadron Histories for VA-34 to VA-38
Chapter 2 Attack Squadron Histories for VA-42 to VA-52
Chapter 2 Attack Squadron Histories for VA-54 to VA-56
Chapter 2 Attack Squadron Histories for VA-64 to VA-75
Chapter 2 Attack Squadron Histories for VA-76 to VA-104
Chapter 2 Attack Squadron Histories for VA-105 to VA-122
Chapter 2 Attack Squadron Histories for VA-125 to VA-153
Chapter 2 Attack Squadron Histories for VA-154 to VA-174
Chapter 2 Attack Squadron Histories for VA-175 to VA-209
Chapter 2 Attack Squadron Histories for VA-210 to VA-873
Chapter 3 Heavy Attack Squadron Histories (VAH) (VAH-8 to VAH-123)
Chapter 4 Tactical Aerial Refueling Squadron Histories (VAK) (VAK-208 to VAK-308)
Chapter 5 Light Attack Squadron History (VAL)
Chapter 6 Heavy Photographic Squadron Histories (VAP)(VAP-61 to VAP-62)
Chapter 7 Strike Fighter Squadron Histories for VFA-15 to VFA-81
Chapter 7 Strike Fighter Squadron Histories for VFA-82 to VFA-106
Chapter 7 Strike Fighter Squadron Histories for VFA-113 to VFA-147
Chapter 7 Strike Fighter Squadron Histories for VFA-151 to VFA-195
Chapter 7 Strike Fighter Squadron Histories for VFA-203 to VFA-305
Appendix 1 Aircraft Data-Technical Information and Drawings, A-3 to AM
Appendix 1 Aircraft Data-Technical Information and Drawings, BG to F9F (F-9)
Appendix 1 Aircraft Data-Technical Information and Drawings, F/A-18 to TC-4C
Appendix 2 Aircraft Carrier Listing
Appendix 3 Carrier Deployments by Year (1946 to 1990)
Appendix 4 U.S. Navy Squadron Designations and Abbreviations
Appendix 5 How to Trace Squadron Lineage
Appendix 6 Lineage Listing for VA, VA(AW), VAH, VA(HM), VAK, VAL, VAP, and VFA Designated Squadrons
Appendix 7 Types of Aircraft Listed in the Squadron Histories

 Viewable and downloadable version of DANAS Volume 2 (847 pages, 18.2 MB PDF file)
These are links to PDF files that are shorter and more manageable subsets of the complete volume:
Table of Contents of DANAS Volume 2, with links to PDF files of individual chapters, appendixes and sections
Title page, About the Author, Contents, Foreword, Preface and Acknowledgements
Chapter 1 Origins of Navy Patrol Aviation, 1911 to 1920s
Chapter 2 Guidelines for Navy Aviation Squadron Lineage and Insignia
Chapter 3 Patrol Squadron (VP) Histories (1st VP-1 to 2nd VP-4)
Chapter 3 Patrol Squadron (VP) Histories (2nd VP-5 to 2nd VP-8)
Chapter 3 Patrol Squadron (VP) Histories (2nd VP-9 to 3rd VP-17)
Chapter 3 Patrol Squadron (VP) Histories (3rd VP-18 to 1st VP-22)
Chapter 3 Patrol Squadron (VP) Histories (3rd VP-22 to 3rd VP-25)
Chapter 3 Patrol Squadron (VP) Histories(2nd VP-26 to 1st VP-29)
Chapter 3 Patrol Squadron (VP) Histories (2nd VP-29 to 1st VP-40)
Chapter 3 Patrol Squadron (VP) Histories (2nd VP-40 to 3rd VP-45)
Chapter 3 Patrol Squadron (VP) Histories (VP-46 to 2nd VP-48)
Chapter 3 Patrol Squadron (VP) Histories (VP-49 to 3rd VP-61)
Chapter 3 Patrol Squadron (VP) Histories (1st VP-62 to VP-90)
Chapter 3 Patrol Squadron (VP) Histories (2nd VP-91 to VP-133)
Chapter 3 Patrol Squadron (VP) Histories (VP-142 to VP-153)
Chapter 4 Patrol Bombing Squadron (VPB) Histories (VPB-1 to VPB-16)
Chapter 4 Patrol Bombing Squadron (VPB) Histories (VPB-17 to VPB-29)
Chapter 4 Patrol Bombing Squadron (VPB) Histories (VPB-33 to VPB-54)
Chapter 4 Patrol Bombing Squadron (VPB) Histories (VPB-61 to VPB-103)
Chapter 4 Patrol Bombing Squadron (VPB) Histories (VPB-105 to VPB-118)
Chapter 4 Patrol Bombing Squadron (VPB) Histories (VPB-121 to VPB-141)
Chapter 4 Patrol Bombing Squadron (VPB) Histories (VPB-145 to VPB-203)
Chapter 4 Patrol Bombing Squadron (VPB) Histories (VPB-206 to VPB-216)
Chapter 5 Heavy Patrol Squadrons (Landplane) (VP-HL) Histories
Chapter 6 Amphibian Patrol Squadrons (VP-AM) Histories
Glossary
Index of Patrol Squadron Histories and Aircraft Data

Squadrons